The Moscow Programme  (Московская программа ЦТ) was a television channel in the Soviet Union. It had a political focus and discussed events in Moscow. Now it is a television station broadcast by the Moscow City Government named TV Centre.

History 
The Moscow Programme was established in March 1965, as Programme Three, with a focus on educational programming. It broadcast from the Shabolovka television building in Moscow. 

As part of the celebrations of the 50th anniversary of the October Revolution in 1967, the new television headquarters was established at Ostankino in Moscow. At this point, all central television programmes in the USSR emanated from there. 

In 1982 Programme Three was renamed Moscow Programme, following Programme 2's upgrading as a national channel. Moscow-centric programming, previously aired on Programme 2 was transferred to Programme 3.

The Moscow Programme transmitted its channel over the SECAM D/K band. In the 1980s it also expanded via the Gorizont satellite across much of Europe and Asia.

When the Soviet Union dissolved in December 1991, the Moscow Television Company (MTK) took over operations of this channel. It aired programmes from 2x2 in the evening. This channel was replaced by TV Centre in 1997.

See also
Soviet Central Television
Eastern Bloc information dissemination

Eastern Bloc mass media
Television in the Soviet Union
Mass media in Moscow
Defunct television channels in Russia
Television channels and stations established in 1965
Television channels and stations disestablished in 1991